Yoan Benyahya (born 26 May 1987) is a French professional footballer who plays as a defender for Championnat National 2 club Granville.

Career 
Benyahya began his career with Nîmes  in 2006 but made only one senior appearance in three years for the club, coming on as a late substitute for Pierre Germann in the 1–0 win over Villemomble on 8 December 2007. In the summer of 2009, he joined Istres and made his Ligue 2 debut in the 0–4 defeat away at Tours on 23 January 2010, replacing Brahim El Bahri after 75 minutes.

After being released by Istres in 2010, Benyahya spent a year without a club before signing with Championnat National outfit Gazélec Ajaccio ahead of the 2011–12 season. On 8 October 2011, he scored his first goal in senior football, netting the winner in the 2–1 victory against Vannes at the Stade Ange Casanova. He played a total of 17 matches during the campaign as Gazélec won promotion to Ligue 2 for the first time in their history.

On 2 October 2012, Benyahya signed for Championnat National side Uzès Pont du Gard, and was a regular pick for the remainder of the 2012–13 season, making 17 appearances. He was released in January 2014.

On 1 February 2016, Benyahya signed for Granville.

References

External links
Yoan Benyahya career statistics at foot-national.com

1987 births
Living people
People from Tarascon
Sportspeople from Bouches-du-Rhône
French footballers
Association football defenders
Nîmes Olympique players
FC Istres players
Gazélec Ajaccio players
ES Uzès Pont du Gard players
US Granville players
Ligue 2 players
Championnat National players
Championnat National 3 players
Championnat National 2 players
Footballers from Provence-Alpes-Côte d'Azur